William Paul Young (born May 11, 1955), referred to as Wm. Paul Young or simply Paul Young, is a Canadian author. He wrote the novels The Shack, Cross Roads, Eve, and the religious book Lies We Believe About God.

Early life 
Young is the oldest of four, born May 11, 1955, in Grande Prairie, Alberta, Canada, but the majority of his first decade was lived with his missionary parents in the highlands of Netherlands New Guinea (West Papua), among the Dani, a central highlands people of western New Guinea.  These became his family and as the first white child and outsider who ever spoke their language, he was granted unusual access into their culture and community. When he was six he was sent to a boarding school.

Career 
Young originally wrote primarily as a way to create unique gifts for his friends, until his wife repeatedly urged him to write something for their six children in order to put down in one place his perspectives on God and on the inner healing Young had experienced as an adult. The resulting manuscript, which later became The Shack, was intended only for his six kids and for a handful of close friends.

Young initially printed just 15 copies of his book. Two of his close friends encouraged him to have it published, and assisted with some editing and rewriting in order to prepare the manuscript for publication. After rejection by 26 publishers, Young and his friends published the book under the name of their newly created publishing company, Windblown Media, in 2007. The company spent only C$200 in advertising; word-of-mouth referrals eventually drove the book to number one on the New York Times trade paperback fiction best-seller list in June 2008. "The Shack" was the top-selling fiction and audio book of 2008 in America through November 30.

Young's second book, Cross Roads, was published on November 13, 2012 by FaithWords.

Young's Eve was released on September 15, 2015 by Howard Books.

Young's latest book, Lies We Believe About God, released March 7, 2017. Like The Shack, it has been the subject of theological criticism. One critic, Tim Challies, says Young is a universalist, teaching that everyone is saved.

Personal life
In 2015, Young lived in Happy Valley, Oregon with his wife.  he lives in Washington. Young has six children and eight grandchildren.

References

External links
 

1955 births
Living people
21st-century American novelists
American male novelists
People from Gresham, Oregon
Novelists from Oregon
Canadian Christians
Canadian emigrants to the United States
People from Grande Prairie
Christian novelists
Canadian male novelists
21st-century American male writers
People from Happy Valley, Oregon